Sonepiprazole (U-101,387, PNU-101,387-G) is a drug of the phenylpiperazine class which acts as a highly selective D4 receptor antagonist. In animals, unlike D2 receptor antagonists like haloperidol, sonepiprazole does not block the behavioral effects of amphetamine or apomorphine, does not alter spontaneous locomotor activity on its own, and lacks extrapyramidal and neuroendocrine effects. However, it does reverse the prepulse inhibition deficits induced by apomorphine, and has also been shown to enhance cortical activity and inhibit stress-induced cognitive impairment. As a result, it was investigated as an antipsychotic for the treatment of schizophrenia in a placebo-controlled clinical trial, but in contrast to its comparator olanzapine no benefits were found and it was not researched further for this indication.

See also 
 Phenylpiperazine
PNU-142633
Terikalant

References 

Isochromenes
Phenylpiperazines
Sulfonamides